Pierrette Caillol (1898–1991) was a French stage and film actress. She was married to the writer-director Yvan Noé.

Filmography

References

Bibliography
 Goble, Alan. The Complete Index to Literary Sources in Film. Walter de Gruyter, 1999.

External links

1898 births
1991 deaths
French film actresses
French silent film actresses
20th-century French actresses
French stage actresses
Actresses from Marseille